Tang Fei (born 15 March 1932) is a retired ROC Air Force general. He served as the premier of the Republic of China between May 20 and October 6, 2000, under the Chen Shui-bian government of the Democratic Progressive Party (DPP), even though he was a member of the Kuomintang (KMT).

Biography 
Tang Fei was born on March 15, 1932, in Taicang, Jiangsu, Republic of China. He enrolled in the Chinese Air Force Preparatory School at the age of 12 and graduated in 1950. He later studied at the Republic of China Air Force Academy from which he graduated in 1952. He completed advanced military education at the Air Force Squadron Officers' Course in 1963, Air Force Command and General Staff College of the Armed Forces University in 1971, and the War College in 1979.

He served in a wide range of combat, staff, and overseas positions during his military career, starting as a pilot from 1953 to 1960, then moving to operations officer from 1960 to 1961, flight leader from 1961 to 1965, and squadron commander from 1968 to 1970.

As his first overseas assignment, Tang was posted to the ROC embassy in Washington as assistant air attaché from 1972 to 1975. Upon returning to Taiwan, he served as chief of the operations section of the Third Wing from 1975 to 1976, and later was group commander from 1976 to 1978. From 1979 to 1982, he was again posted abroad, this time as armed forces attaché in the ROC embassy in South Africa.

Back in Taiwan, he served as wing commander from 1983 to 1984 and Air Force deputy chief of staff for pPlanning from 1984 to 1985. In 1985, Tang was appointed superintendent of the Chinese Air Force Academy, and was later promoted to director of the Air Force's Department of Political Warfare, the position that he held from 1986 to 1989.

In 1989, he first served as commanding general of the Combat Air Command and then vice commander-in-chief of the ROC Air Force from 1989 to 1991. He was then appointed director of the Department of Inspection of the Ministry of National Defense (MND) from 1991 to 1992, commander-in-chief of the ROC Air Force from 1992 to 1995, and vice chief of the general staff (executive) from 1995 to 1998.

In 1998, he was promoted to four-star general and chief of the general staff. He became the first military officer to answer questions during interpellations at the Legislative Yuan. In 1999, he retired from the military, upon his appointment as minister of national defense, a civilian position.

Tang was not only responsible for essential military equipment and personnel modernization programs, but he was also instrumental in formulating the new National Defense Law and the Organization Law of the Ministry of National Defense, which reorganized and streamlined the military command structure, giving the MND more authority over the General Staff Headquarters.

On March 29, 2000, president-elect Chen Shui-bian announced that Tang had been chosen as premier to head the new cabinet. He served as premier until his resignation four and a half months later on 3 October.

|-

|-

|-

References

1932 births
Living people
Harvard Kennedy School people
Hoover Institution people
Republic of China Air Force personnel
Air force generals
Kuomintang politicians in Taiwan
Politicians from Suzhou
Premiers of the Republic of China on Taiwan
Taiwanese Ministers of National Defense
Republic of China politicians from Jiangsu
Taiwanese people from Jiangsu
People from Taicang